Joseph "Josa" Lee (1911 - 18 December 1967) was an Irish hurler who played as a midfielder for the Cork senior team.

Born in Blackpool, Lee arrived on the inter-county scene at the age of twenty when he first linked up with the Cork minor team before later joining the senior side. He joined the senior panel during the 1932 championship. Lee later became a semi-regular member of the starting fifteen, however, he ended his playing days without silverware.

At club level Lee was a six-time championship medallist with Glen Rovers.

Throughout his career Lee made one championship appearance. He retired from inter-county hurling following the conclusion of the 1936 championship.

Honours

Player

Glen Rovers
Cork Senior Hurling Championship (6): 1934 (c), 1935 (c), 1936 (c), 1937 (c), 1938 (c), 1939

Cork
All-Ireland Minor Hurling Championship (1): 1928
Munster Minor Hurling Championship (1): 1928

References

1911 births
1967 deaths
Glen Rovers hurlers
Cork inter-county hurlers